Zalaris is a Norwegian company that delivers HR and payroll services to companies in Northern Europe, the Baltic region, UK, Ireland, Germany and Poland. The company is headquartered in Oslo, Norway.

The company was founded in 2000 by Hans-Petter Mellerud. Zalaris was listed on the Oslo Stock Exchange in June 2014 with a market capitalization of 440 million NOK.

References

Outsourcing companies
Business services companies established in 2000
Companies based in Oslo
Companies listed on the Oslo Stock Exchange
2000 establishments in Norway